Kevin Stiven Reyes Ortiz (born 28 August 1999) is a Salvadoran professional footballer who plays as a midfielder or winger for Primera División club FAS and the El Salvador national team.

Career

Reyes started his career with Salvadoran side Santa Tecla. Before the second half of 2020–21, he signed for FAS in the Salvadoran top flight. In September 2022, Reyes signed for Armenian club Alashkert, becoming the first Salvadoran to play in Armenia. On 16 December 2022, FAS announced the return of Reyes.

References

External links

  

1999 births
C.D. Águila footballers
FC Alashkert players
Armenian Premier League players
Association football midfielders
Association football wingers
C.D. FAS footballers
El Salvador international footballers
El Salvador youth international footballers
Expatriate footballers in Armenia
Living people
Salvadoran expatriate footballers
Salvadoran footballers
Salvadoran Primera División players
Santa Tecla F.C. footballers